Archytaea is a genus of flowering plants belonging to the family Bonnetiaceae.

Its native range is Southern Tropical America.

Species:

Archytaea angustifolia 
Archytaea triflora

References

Bonnetiaceae
Malpighiales genera